Peardon is a surname. It may refer to
Celeste Comegys Peardon (1898-1988), American writer
Derek Peardon (born 1950), former Australian rules football player
Patricia Peardon (1923/1924)-1993, American actress and sculptor

Surnames